is a passenger railway station in the city of Ichikawa, Chiba, Japan, operated by the third sector Hokusō Railway.

Lines

Station layout
This station consists of two opposed elevated side platforms serving two tracks, with the station building underneath.

Platforms

Adjacent stations

History
Ōmachi Station was opened on 31 March 1991. On 17 July 2010 a station numbering system was introduced to the Hokusō Line, with the station designated HS07.

Passenger statistics
In fiscal 2018, the station was used by an average of 842 passengers daily.

Surrounding area
 Ichikawa City Botanical Garden

See also
 List of railway stations in Japan

References

External links

 Hokusō Line station information 

Railway stations in Japan opened in 1991
Railway stations in Chiba Prefecture
Hokusō Line
Ichikawa, Chiba